Kusa mochi ("herb mochi"), also known as kusamochi or yomogi mochi, is a Japanese sweet. It is made from mochi and leaves of yomogi, also known as Japanese mugwort. Because Japanese mugwort is kneaded into the mochi, kusa mochi takes on a vivid green color. The greenness of it depends on the amount of Japanese mugwort blended in the mochi. It is also beneficial as medicinal food.

History 

The custom to knead Japanese mugwort was transmitted from the Chinese. Documents state that nobles were eating kusa mochi during palace events in the Heian era. It used to be made with Jersey cudweed before the Heian era. However, since the Heian era, people started to make kusa mochi using Japanese mugwort (or yomogi) because of its capability to boost fertility and as medicinal food was discovered. Another purported reason for the change in ingredients was because Jersey cudweed is called Haha-ko-gusa which literally translates to "mother-and-child grass". As kusa mochi was enjoyed with a purpose of wishing for the health and well-being of mother and her children, it was considered ominous to knead jersey cudweed into the mochi.

Since the Edo-era, kusa mochi began to be used as offering for Hinamatsuri (the Girl's Festival). The reason it was chosen as the offering was because of the vivid green color that represents fresh verdure. Another reason why it was chosen as an offering is because of the medicinal power of Japanese mugwort. Japanese mugwort is known for its vitality, which makes it difficult to eradicate. Kusa mochi was used as an offering with a desire of health and longevity.

As medicinal food 

The idea of food being fundamentally connected to medication has been present for a long time. The Japanese mugwort, which is the main ingredient of kusa mochi, has a history of at least 2,500 years of medicinal use. In one piece of Japanese ancient literature, it is stated that Japanese mugwort can be used as a hemostatic, a medicine for diarrhea, and for miscarriage prevention, and these uses are still put to practical use today. Japanese mugwort has many active ingredients that are beneficial to the body, such that it is also known as "the queen of herbs". Some of its components are dietary fiber, chlorophyll, vitamin B1 and vitamin B2. Some of its effects are preventing constipation, ameliorating the intestinal environment, and having antioxidant action. Research done in by the Hokkaido Tokachi Area Regional Food Processing Technology Center has claimed that Japanese mugwort is effective in improving blood flow. It is said that it helps expand the blood vessels and thus effective for people with bad circulation.

The Japanese mugwort is a member of the asteraceae plant family, which some people have allergies to.

See also 

 Qingtuan, the original Chinese form of this dish, also consumed during the spring
 Caozai guo, the Fujianese form

References 

Wagashi
Holiday foods